The Porcelain Tower of Nanjing, part of the former Great Bao'en Temple, is a historical site located on the south bank of external Qinhuai River in Nanjing, China. It was a pagoda constructed in the 15th century during the Ming dynasty, but was mostly destroyed in the 19th century during the course of the Taiping Rebellion. A modern life-size replica of it now exists in Nanjing.

In 2010 Wang Jianlin, a Chinese businessman, donated a billion yuan (US$156 million) to the city of Nanjing for its reconstruction. This is reported to be the largest single personal donation ever made in China. In December 2015, the modern replica and surrounding park opened to the public.

History 

The Porcelain Tower of Nanjing was designed during the reign of the Yongle Emperor (r. 1402–1424) and shortly after its construction began in the early 15th century. It was first discovered by the Western world when European travelers like Johan Nieuhof visited it, sometimes listing it as one of the Seven Wonders of the World. After this exposure to the outside world, the tower was seen as a national treasure to both locals and other cultures around the world.

On 25 March 1428, the Xuande Emperor ordered Zheng He and others to supervise the rebuilding and repair of the Great Bao'en Temple at Nanjing. He completed the construction of the temple in 1431.
  
In 1801, the tower was struck by lightning and the top four stories were knocked off, but it was soon restored. The 1843 book, The Closing Events of the Campaign in China by Granville Gower Loch, contains a detailed description of the tower as it existed in the early 1840s. In the 1850s, the area surrounding the tower erupted in civil war as the Taiping Rebellion reached Nanjing and the rebels took over the city. They smashed the Buddhist images and destroyed the inner staircase to deny the Qing enemy an observation platform. American sailors reached the city in May 1854 and visited the hollowed tower. In 1856, the Taiping razed the tower to the ground either in order to prevent a hostile faction from using it to observe and shell the city or from superstitious fear of its geomantic properties. After this, the tower's remnants were salvaged for use in other buildings, while the site lay dormant until a recent surge to try to rebuild the landmark.

Description 

The top of the roof was marked by a golden pineapple. There were original plans to add more stories, according to an American missionary who in 1852 visited Nanjing. There are only a few Chinese pagodas that surpass its height, such as the still existent  11th-century Liaodi Pagoda in Hebei or the no longer existent  7th-century wooden pagoda of Chang'an.

The tower was built with white porcelain bricks that were said to reflect the sun's rays during the day, and at night as many as 140 lamps were hung from the building to illuminate the tower. Glazes and stoneware were worked into the porcelain and created a mixture of green, yellow, brown and white designs on the sides of the tower, including animals, flowers and landscapes. The tower was also decorated with numerous Buddhist images.

Fragments of the original tower may exist in the Calcutta Museum, presented by the Geological Survey of India, 7 August 1877. A small fragment belongs to the Georgia Historical Society in Savannah, Georgia.

Gallery

References

External links 

  (English subtitle)
 The Closing Events of the Campaign in China by Granville Gower Loch. London 1843.
Great Bao'en Monastery, Architectura Sinica Site Archive

Towers completed in the 15th century
Buildings and structures in Nanjing
Tower of Nanjing, Porcelain
Demolished buildings and structures in China
Towers in China
Chinese ceramic works
Former towers
Yongle Emperor
Individual pieces of porcelain